Giovanni Acerbi (14 November 1825, Castel Goffredo - 4 September 1869, Florence) was an Italian soldier, politician and supporter of Risorgimento.

1825 births
1869 deaths
People from Castel Goffredo
Deputies of Legislature IX of the Kingdom of Italy
Deputies of Legislature X of the Kingdom of Italy
People of the Italian unification